The Sultan Iskandar Building (BSI) is a customs, immigration and quarantine (CIQ) complex in Johor Bahru, Johor, Malaysia. Located at the northern end of the Johor–Singapore Causeway, it is one of two land ports of entry to Malaysia on the Malaysia–Singapore border.

The building was named after the late Sultan Iskandar of Johor. The building started operations in 2008, replacing the former Johor Bahru Checkpoint.

From Malaysia, the main expressway leading to the building is the Johor Bahru Eastern Dispersal Link Expressway. After border inspection, vehicles (and pedestrians) continue onto the Causeway, eventually reaching the Woodlands Checkpoint in Singapore. Pedestrian access to the building is provided via the Johor Bahru Sentral railway station, which is linked to the building by a footbridge.

History

Background 
Originally even after Johor and Singapore is made different entity by the British and Johor–Singapore Causeway was built to accommodate land access between both states, no such border control was established due to both still falls under British's Straits territory purview. However checks would be done periodically due to extraordinary circumstances in both side, such as Malayan Emergency by local polices, but otherwise the citizens of both sides are free to roam between the regions without many conditions. This also extends to the point when Malaya, including Johor achieved independence in 1957 while Singapore is still part of the Crown Colony and also when Singapore and Malaya formed Federation of Malaysia later on. However the necessities for a proper border control arose when Singapore was separated from Malaysia, making them a sovereign country of their own in 1965.

Establishment of border control 
When the border control was first established between both Malaysia and Singapore, the only necessary document was mainly only identity cards issued by both governments to pass through and both countries still retained joined visa issuance to visitors. However, as authorities on both sides are still concerned of each other affairs, the join visa was later discontinued, and tighter control was later introduced using either international passport or special limited passport for Johor-Singapore crossing as of 1967. This also triggers the need of establishment of a proper border checkpoint building on both sides, where Malaysia established their own custom and immigration complex in Johor Bahru for this purpose.

Old Immigration and Custom complex 
The old Custom, Immigration and Quarantine (CIQ) complex was later established right on the Johor end of the Causeway, just before the Johor Bahru town centre. Originally it is just a simple two-storey building with lanes for pedestrian, buses, cars and lorries, which were rather limited considering the traffic back then. 

In the 1980s, the CIQ was later rebuilt and the lanes were expanded not only to accommodate increasing traffic between both sides by introducing more lanes and facilities for motorists and pedestrian, but also to accommodate upgrades of the main route to the Causeway, Jalan Tun Abdul Razak, which later became part of Skudai Highway. While the original plan to make Skudai Highway part of North-South Expressway was scrapped due to Johor Bahru's town developments restricting the road upgrades, a toll plaza was introduced on the CIQ complex and started charging motorists that passed through the Causeway, in or out. 

Improvements and additions were introduced further as number of crossers grow, however pressing need for a better immigration complex to match with Singapore's Woodlands Checkpoint and checkpoints in Second Link Expressway give birth to a new integrated gateway complex proposal later on.

Southern Integrated Gateway and new complex 
In 2002, accommodating to growing need for a better, smoother border crossing condition, a plan named Southern Integrated Gateway is proposed to combine new CIQ complex, new bus and train stations as well as new bridge to replace Malaysian side of Causeway, which is deemed irrelevant of its current state. 
The plan is to move the CIQ to Bukit Chagar, where later it would be connected to Tanjung Puteri bridge (the new Causeway replacement bridge) as well as flyovers from a new highway (Johor Bahru Eastern Dispersal Link Expressway) and other roads nearby elevated. It also will be connected to a new train station, Johor Bahru Sentral station via a footbridge. More clearance lanes are also proposed in this building as well as new and bigger clearance hall for pedestrian and public bus commuters. Both clearance areas are covered. 

All plans were later passed by the Federal Government of Malaysia, and preliminary work begin in 2003. However, despite some groundwork already ongoing, the Tanjung Puteri bridge plan was cancelled by the federal government, now under Abdullah Ahmad Badawi as Prime Minister, citing costs and diplomatic issues. However other projects continued as planned with the new CIQ is done and fully operating in December 2008 for all motorists, named Sultan Iskandar CIQ in honour of the Sultan of Johor back then, Sultan Iskandar Al-haj.

However the plan and its later execution was criticized by user especially during the first months, by motorists due to bad entry lanes, lack of signs and guide to follow, and also pedestrian due to the location change adding distance to the CIQ and access route layout on the Causeway side is not pedestrian friendly. 
After the complex fully operates, old CIQ complex is entirely put in disuse and later demolished.

Components

Immigration Checkpoint

The immigration checkpoint has different checkpoints for bus passengers, bus drivers, lorries, motorcycles and cars.  The checkpoint was designed with 38 counters for cars entering Malaysia, and 39 counters for those departing from Malaysia. There are 50 counters in each direction for motorcycles entering and departing Malaysia. The Secured Automated Clearance System for Malaysian Citizen Motorcyclists (M-BIKE) are provided here for all Malaysian citizen motorcyclists only, while foreigners can use Manual Counters for Motorcyclists.

Customs Checkpoint

At the customs checkpoint, 36 counters are designated for cars (20 for those arriving in Malaysia and 16 for those leaving the country) and 25 for motorcycles (17 for arrivals and 8 for departures).

Tolls
All toll transactions at the CIQ complex are conducted electronically with Touch 'n Go. All foreign-registered vehicles embarking from the Singapore Woodlands checkpoint can purchase a TnG card at an old building on the left side of the causeway before approaching Johor.

The move to implement only electronic toll transactions at the new CIQ complex is part of a government strategy to urge the public to migrate to electronic toll transactions, as well as smooth the traffic flow at the CIQ complex.

The complex is equipped with a customer service centre and reload lanes, which operate daily to enable the public to purchase, reload, or check their Touch-N-Go cards' prepaid balance.

PLUS Expressways Toll Charges
(Starting 1 August 2014)

Note: Toll charges can only be paid with the Touch 'n Go card or RFID via TnG eWallet. Cash payment is not accepted.

See also
Sultan Abu Bakar Complex

External links

Sultan Iskandar Building website

2008 establishments in Malaysia
Malaysia–Singapore border crossings
Southern Integrated Gateway
Transport infrastructure completed in 2008